Danilo Aparecido da Silva (born 24 November 1986), or simply known as Danilo Silva, is a retired Brazilian professional footballer who played as a centre-back. Silva announced his retirement from football on 23 September 2020.

Club career
Dynamo Kyiv bought Danilo for R$9,867,760 from Internacional (50%) and third parties owner (50%).

International career
In an interview with the coach of the Ukraine national team Mykhaylo Fomenko spoke of him as a possible naturalized. Danilo Silva indicated that he would be likely to accept a call-up for Ukraine national team if asked.

Honours

São Paulo
Campeonato Brasileiro Série A: 2007

Internacional
Campeonato Gaúcho: 2009
Suruga Bank Championship: 2009

Dynamo Kyiv
Ukrainian Premier League: 2014–15, 2015–16
Ukrainian Cup: 2013–14, 2014–15
Ukrainian Super Cup: 2011, 2016

Los Angeles FC
Supporters' Shield: 2019

References

External links
 globoesporte.globo.com 
 Transferred to Real Madrid 
 

1986 births
Living people
Brazilian footballers
Brazilian expatriate footballers
Expatriate soccer players in the United States
Expatriate footballers in Ukraine
New York Red Bulls players
Guarani FC players
São Paulo FC players
Sport Club Internacional players
FC Dynamo Kyiv players
Campeonato Brasileiro Série A players
Ukrainian Premier League players
Major League Soccer players
Brazilian expatriate sportspeople in Ukraine
Brazilian expatriate sportspeople in the United States
Los Angeles FC players
Association football defenders
Sportspeople from Campinas